Chengiopanax is a small genus of flowering plants in the family Araliaceae, native to China and Japan. Chengiopanax sciadophylloides is known to be a hyperaccumulator of manganese.

Species
Currently accepted species include:

Chengiopanax fargesii (Franch.) C.B.Shang & J.Y.Huang - China
Chengiopanax sciadophylloides (Franch. & Sav.) C.B.Shang & J.Y.Huang - Japan

References

Araliaceae
Flora of South-Central China
Flora of Southeast China
Flora of Japan
Apiales genera